Doomsday L.A. is the second live DVD released by Deicide. It was released shortly after the Doomsday L.A. live EP was released on iTunes. The bonus material on the DVD includes interviews with the band members and the videos for "Homage For Satan" and "Desecration".

Track listing
 "Intro"
 "Dead by Dawn"
 "Once Upon the Cross"
 "Scars of the Crucifix"
 "The Stench of Redemption"
 "Death to Jesus"
 "When Satan Rules His World"
 "Serpents of the Light"
 "Dead but Dreaming"
 "They Are the Children of the Underworld"
 "Bastard of Christ"
 "Desecration"
 "Behind the Light Thou Shall Rise"
 "When Heaven Burns"
 "Walk with the Devil in Dreams You Behold"
 "Homage for Satan"
 "Lunatic of God's Creation"
 "Kill the Christian"
 "Sacrificial Suicide"

Personnel
 Glen Benton – bass, vocals
 Ralph Santolla – lead guitar
 Jack Owen – rhythm guitar
 Steve Asheim – drums

Deicide (band) video albums
2007 live albums
2007 video albums
Live video albums